Andrew Payze (born 25 August 1966) is a former professional Australian rules footballer who played for the Adelaide Football Club in the Australian Football League (AFL). He also had a long career at the West Torrens Football Club and Woodville-West Torrens Football Club in the South Australian National Football League (SANFL).

Payze was a runner up in the Magarey Medal and won the West Torrens 'Best and Fairest' award in 1986. He was then picked up by Essendon with the ninth pick in the 1986 VFL draft but returned to South Australia after being unable to break into the seniors. A wingman, he represented South Australia at the 1988 Adelaide Bicentennial Carnival and played six times in all for his state during his career, included a match as captain in 1994.

After another failed attempt to launch an AFL career, at Richmond, Payze became a foundation player at the Adelaide Crows when they joined the competition in 1991. He however could only manage 14 appearances and continued in the SANFL, with the newly formed Woodville-West Torrens, with whom he was a premiership winner in 1993. By the time he retired in 1998, Payze had amassed 308 SANFL games and kicked 233 goals. He is a life member, life governor and wingman in the Woodville-West Torrens official 'Team of the Decade'.

References

Holmesby, Russell and Main, Jim (2007). The Encyclopedia of AFL Footballers. 7th ed. Melbourne: Bas Publishing.

1966 births
Living people
Australian rules footballers from South Australia
Adelaide Football Club players
West Torrens Football Club players
Woodville-West Torrens Football Club players
South Australian State of Origin players